Lori Christine Eddy (born August 26, 1971, in Lunenburg, Nova Scotia) is a Canadian curler from Dundas, Ontario.

Career
Eddy played third on the Alison Goring rink that represented Ontario at the 1997 Scott Tournament of Hearts, Canada's national women's curling championship. The team made it to the finals of the event, where they lost to Saskatchewan's Sandra Schmirler. Later that year, the team played in the 1997 Canadian Olympic Curling Trials, but finished tied for eighth place. Over the next few years, Eddy would play for a number of different skips in Ontario including Janet Brown (later McGhee), Marilyn Bodogh, Jacqueline Harrison, Allison Flaxey, Cathy Auld and Julie Hastings. Eddy attended the 2013 Canadian Olympic Curling Trials as an alternate for team Sherry Middaugh. She was also an alternate for Middaugh at the 2014 Canada Cup of Curling. On the World Curling Tour, she won the 2005 Shorty Jenkins Classic playing for McGhee.

Eddy returned to the Hearts 23 years after her silver medal finish in 2020, skipping Team Nunavut. Despite living in Ontario, Eddy was added to the team as the territory's "import player", after being asked by her friend, Alison Griffin who also plays second for Nunavut. The team automatically qualified for the Scotties as no other team in the Territory decided to challenge them. Eddy led Nunavut to a 2–5 record, including a surprise win against Northern Ontario's Krista McCarville. Team Eddy represented Nunavut again the following year at the 2021 Scotties Tournament of Hearts, where they finished with a winless 0–8 record.

Eddy won the Ontario Mixed Championship in 2022 playing third for Scott McDonald.

Personal life
Eddy co-hosts the podcast "2 Girls and a Game" with former teammate Mary Chilvers. She is married and has one daughter.

References

External links

1971 births
Living people
Curlers from Nova Scotia
Canadian women curlers
Canadian women podcasters
Canadian podcasters
People from Lunenburg County, Nova Scotia
Curlers from Hamilton, Ontario
People from Dundas, Ontario